Carl Björkman may refer to:

Carl Björkman (politician) (1873–1948), politician on the Åland Islands, Finland
Carl Björkman (sport shooter) (1869–1960), Swedish sport shooter

See also
 Carl Björk (disambiguation)